The Sunnyvale Heritage Park Museum is a historical museum located in Sunnyvale, California. It is a replica of the original Martin Murphy family home.

The Martin Murphy family, founders of the City of Sunnyvale, constructed the house in the 1850s.  Since there were no sawmills near Sunnyvale at that time, they had the lumber milled and the house assembled to their specifications in Bangor, Maine, then shipped it in pieces around Cape Horn to Sunnyvale, where it was reassembled.  It was held together with wooden pegs and leather straps, and was the first wood-frame house in Sunnyvale. The Sunnyvale Historical Society obtained its designation as a California State Historical Landmark in 1958. It was demolished by the city in 1961 due to extensive damage following a fire.

The Sunnyvale Historical Museum was constructed as a replica at Sunnyvale Heritage Park next to the Sunnyvale Community Center, and was dedicated and opened in September, 2008, as a testament to the history of Sunnyvale and the contributions made by the Martin Murphy family towards the founding of Sunnyvale.  It was funded through public donations and contributions from the State of California and the City of Sunnyvale. In the main exhibit room is a 60-foot mural of Sunnyvale history.

Heritage Park also includes a Heritage Orchard of apricot trees and a barn with an outdoor interpretive exhibit on the agricultural history of the Santa Clara Valley. In December 2018, after removal of a park maintenance building, a new front entrance to the museum was created with additional outside exhibits.

References

External links
Sunnyvale Heritage Park Museum

Buildings and structures demolished in 1961
Museums in Santa Clara County, California
History museums in California
Sunnyvale, California